Reno Piscopo (born 27 May 1998) is an Australian professional footballer who plays as a winger for Newcastle Jets in the Australian A-League.

Early life
Piscopo was born in Melbourne, Australia to an Italian father and Maltese mother.

Club career

Youth
Piscopo began his youth career with Melbourne Phoenix, and later the Genova International School of Soccer. He was signed by Inter Milan in 2011, where he played with the youth teams for six years, before signing with Torino in 2017 to join the youth setup.

Renate
In August 2017, Piscopo was transferred to Renate, signing a three-year deal. Piscopo stated his intentions for leaving Torino were attain more first team experience. He made his league debut on 27 August as a substitute in a 3–0 win at home against Padova.

Wellington Phoenix
In August 2019, Piscopo signed a three-year deal with Wellington Phoenix.

Newcastle Jets
After departing Wellington at the conclusion of his contract, Piscopo signed a two-year deal with rival A-League side the Newcastle Jets.

International career

At international youth level, he made his debut with the Italy under-15 against Russia (0–0) on 20 March 2013. He later represented the Italy under-17, and most recently the Australia under-20.

Piscopo qualified for the Tokyo 2020 Olympics. He was part of the Olyroos Olympic squad. The team beat Argentina in their first group match but were unable to win another match. They were therefore not in medal contention. He is also eligible to represent Malta.

Honours
Individual
A-Leagues All Star: 2022

References

External links

1998 births
Living people
Australian soccer players
Italian footballers
Association football midfielders
Inter Milan players
Torino F.C. players
A.C. Renate players
Wellington Phoenix FC players
Australian people of Italian descent
Australian people of Maltese descent
Soccer players from Melbourne
Footballers at the 2020 Summer Olympics
Olympic soccer players of Australia
Australian expatriate sportspeople in New Zealand
Expatriate association footballers in New Zealand
Australian expatriate soccer players
Italian expatriate footballers
Italian expatriate sportspeople in New Zealand
Italy youth international footballers
Australia youth international soccer players